Jean-Michel Dubois (born 27 August 1943 in Enghien-les-Bains, Val-d'Oise) is a French politician and a member of the far-right FN.  He was a member of the Gaullist Rally for the Republic until 1985.

Dubois stood for the FN in many elections, mostly regional and local elections, since 1986. Since the 2004 French regional elections, he is a regional councillor in Île-de-France

In 2009, the FN selected him to lead the FN list in the Île-de-France constituency ahead of the 2009 European elections.

References

1943 births
Living people
People from Enghien-les-Bains
Rally for the Republic politicians
National Rally (France) politicians
Recipients of Étoile Civique